Lucayan may refer to:

Lucayan Archipelago, comprising the Bahamas and the Turks and Caicos Islands
Lucayan people, the original inhabitants of the Bahamas before the arrival of Europeans
Lucayan language, a dialect of the extinct Taíno language
Lucayan Formation, a geologic formation in the Bahamas
 a resident of Lucaya, Bahamas